Givi Chokheli Stadium is a multi-use stadium in Telavi, Georgia.  It is used mostly for football matches and is the home stadium of FC Kakheti Telavi. The stadium is able to hold 12,000 people.  The statue of Georgian footballer and Telavi native Givi Chokheli stands in front of the stadium.

See also 
Stadiums in Georgia

References

Sports venues in Georgia (country)
Football venues in Georgia (country)
Buildings and structures in Kakheti
FC Telavi